Mark Chanloung (born 9 February 1995) is an Italian-born cross-country skier competing for Thailand.

Career
Chanloung originally competed for Italy and switched to competing for Thailand, as he holds dual citizenship.

2017 Asian Winter Games
Chanloung competed for Thailand at the 2017 Asian Winter Games in Sapporo, Japan. However, his results did not count towards the official results as he had not met the requirements to compete for the team (the minimum amount of time had not been met in waiting to switch to competing for another country).

2018 Winter Olympics
Chanloung is scheduled to compete for Thailand at the 2018 Winter Olympics. Mark and his sister Karen Chanloung are scheduled to be the only cross-country skiers on the team.

References

1995 births
Mark Chanloung
Living people
Mark Chanloung
Italian people of Thai descent
People from Gressoney-La-Trinité
Cross-country skiers at the 2018 Winter Olympics
Cross-country skiers at the 2022 Winter Olympics
Mark Chanloung